YARD, is an embedded documentation generator for the Ruby programming language. It analyzes the Ruby source code, generating a structured collection of pages for Ruby objects and methods. Code comments can be added in a natural style.

YARD is useful even if the target source code does not contain explicit comments. YARD will still parse the classes, modules, and methods, and list them in the generated API files.

YARD extends upon the capabilities of RDoc in a number of dimensions:
 extensibility
 modularity
 parsing

Dan Kubb has created an ancillary tool, named Yardstick, which verifies YARD (or RDoc) documentation coverage.

See also 
 Comparison of documentation generators
 RDoc
 Ruby Document format

References

External links 
 YARD project home page
 Loren Segal's YARD page on GitHub
 Dan Kubb's Yardstick page on GitHub

Free documentation generators
Software using the MIT license